General elections were held in Aruba on 29 July 1994. The Aruban People's Party (AVP) emerged as the largest party, winning ten of the 21 seats in the Estates. The AVP formed a coalition government with the Aruban Liberal Organization with Henny Eman as Prime Minister.

Results

References

Elections in Aruba
Aruba
1994 in Aruba
July 1994 events